This is a list of colleges in Canada. Colleges are distinct from universities in Canada as they are typically not degree-granting institutions, though some may be enabled by provincial legislation to grant degrees using joint programs with universities or by permission of the provincial Minister of Education.

Alberta

 Sundance College
 ABM College of Health and Technology
 Ambrose University College
 Bow Valley College
 Burman University
 Grande Prairie Regional College
 Keyano College
 The King's University College
 Lakeland College
 Lethbridge College
 MaKami College
 Medicine Hat College
 NorQuest College
 Northern Alberta Institute of Technology
 Olds College
 Prairie College
 Red Deer Polytechnic
 Reeves College
 Robertson College
 Southern Alberta Institute of Technology

British Columbia

 Acsenda School of Management

 Alexander College
 British Columbia Institute of Technology
 Cambria College
 Camosun College
 Canadian College
 Coast Mountain College
 College of New Caledonia
 College of the Rockies
 Columbia College
 Cornerstone International Community College of Canada
 Create Career College
 Douglas College
 Educacentre College (French language institution)
 Eton College, Vancouver
 First College
 Langara College
 North Island College
 Northern Lights College
 Okanagan College
 Royal Roads University
 Selkirk College
 Sprott Shaw College
 Vancouver Community College
 Vancouver Institute of Media Arts  (VanArts)

Manitoba

 Sundance College
 Assiniboine Community College
 Red River College
 Robertson College
 University College of the North
 Manitoba Institute of Trades and Technology

New Brunswick

 Collège communautaire du Nouveau-Brunswick
 Maritime College of Forest Technology
 McKenzie College
 New Brunswick College of Craft and Design
 New Brunswick Community College
 Oulton College

Newfoundland and Labrador

 College of the North Atlantic

Northwest Territories

 Aurora College
 Collège nordique francophone

Nova Scotia

 Canadian Coast Guard College
 Gaelic College
 Nova Scotia Community College

Nunavut

 Nunavut Arctic College

Ontario

 Algonquin College
 Beta College 
 Cambrian College
 Canadore College
 Centennial College
 Collège Boréal
 Conestoga College
 Confederation College
 Durham College
 The New College
 Toulon Vocational College
 Fanshawe College
 Fleming College
 George Brown College
 Georgian College
 Humber College
 La Cité collégiale
 Lambton College
 Loyalist College
 Mohawk College
 Niagara College
 Northern College
 Our Lady Seat of Wisdom College
 St. Clair College
 St. Lawrence College
 Sault College
 Seneca College
 Sheridan College

 Springfield College Brampton

Prince Edward Island

 Collège de l'Île
 Holland College

Quebec

Public institutions

Private institutions

Saskatchewan

 Bethany College, Hepburn
 Briercrest College and Seminary, Caronport
 Carlton Trail College, Humboldt
 Horizon College and Seminary, Saskatoon
 College Mathieu, Gravelbourg (French language institution)
 Cumberland College,  Nipawin, Tisdale, Melfort and Hudson Bay
 Eston College, Eston
 Great Plains College,  various locations
 Lakeland College,  Lloydminster
 Nipawin Bible College, Nipawin
 North West College,  the Battlefords and Meadow Lake
 Northlands College,  La Ronge, Buffalo Narrows and Creighton
 Parkland College, Melville
 St Peter's College, Muenster
 Saskatchewan Indian Institute of Technologies, various
 Saskatchewan Polytechnic, Moose Jaw, Prince Albert, Regina, Saskatoon
 Southeast College, Weyburn
 Western Academy Broadcasting College, Saskatoon

Yukon

 Yukon School of Visual Arts

See also
Higher education in Canada
List of business schools in Canada
Polytechnics Canada
Open access in Canada to scholarly communication

External links
 Studying in Canada: Choosing a school, college or university
 Best College In  Calgary,Canada
 Map of all Colleges in Canada
Complete list of Canada colleges and universities (all campus locations)

References

Lists of universities and colleges by country